Dr. Ayyathan Janaki Ammal (1881–1945) was the first female doctor in Kerala and also in Malabar region which was an administrative district of Madras Presidency during British rule in India. She was also the first female doctor from the Thiyya community and also hailed with the title as the first Malayali lady doctor and surgeon.
 and the sister to Ayyathan Gopalan. a social reformer of Kerala, the founder of the Sugunavardhini movement (1900), Depressed Classes Mission (1909) and the leader and propagandist of Brahmo Samaj in Kerala.

Biography 
She was born into "Ayyathan" family (aristocratic Thiyya royal family of Malabar) at Telicherry, the daughter of Ayyathan Chandhan and Kallat Chiruthammal.

She studied at the Telicherry Elementary School and moved to convent school, Calicut in 1897. She then joined Madras Medical College in 1902 on scholarship and passed the LMP examination (sub assistant surgeon) in 1907 with the highest rank and with honors. That same year she joined government service at Chenkelpet government hospital where her career started as an assistant surgeon and physician. She came back to Calicut to work at the Leprosy hospital where she worked for years before leaving back to Madras where she joined the Trichy government hospital.

Janaki Ammal was service-oriented and was a social activist. She had worked with the Sugunavardhini movement to uplift women and people from the downtrodden sections of society. Along with her brother Dr.Ayyathan Gopalan, she conducted free medical camps while working at Calicut together with Kallat Kausallya Ammal(wife of Dr.Gopalan) and 
Dr.Alummoottil Cochoomani Mandhakini Bai(Ayathan Gopalan's daughter-in-law)

Janaki Ammal is considered a pioneer in fighting for women's rights in the Sugunavardhini movement.

She died in 1945.

Bibliography 
 "Appan oru ormapusthakam" (Malayalam), author Ayathan Alok.
 "Darsar, The untold story of an unsung hero" (English) written by Ayathan Alok.
 Kerala Charithram vol2 by P.S. Velayudhan
 Ente ammayude ormadaykk (1901) Biography of Kallat Chiruthammal, written by DR.Ayathan Gopalan.
 M.S.Nair, Manasu enna Daivam
 C.K.Moosath, The role of Kelappan in harijan activities
 M.P.Manmadhan, Kelappan Biography
 Maharshi Vaghbhatananda Gurudevar, by Swami Brahmavrithan
 Prof. Sreedharan Menon .A. (1967). A Survey of Kerala History. Kottayam: Sahitya Pravarthaka Co-operative Society [Sales Dept.]; National Book Stall.
 Prof.Sreedharamenon .A. (1987) Kerala History and its Makers, Kottayam; National bookstall
 Kurup, K. K. N. (1988), Modern Kerala: Studies in Social and Agrarian Relations, Mittal Publications, 
 Kurup (1988), p. 94
 Mithavadi paper (1917)
 Kurup, K. K. N. (September 1988). "Peasantry and the Anti-Imperialist Struggles in Kerala". Social Scientist. 16 (9): 35–45. doi:10.2307/3517171. JSTOR 3517171.
 Biography of Brahmanada Sivayogi written by K Bheeman Nair Asathyathil ninnu sathyathilekku(അസത്യത്തിൽ നിന്ന് സത്യത്തിലേക്ക്)
 Biography of Brahmananda Swami Sivayogy by A K Nair
 Brahmananda Swami Sivayogi by Pavana
 Journal of Indian history, University of Kerela Press, 2001 p270

References

Madras Medical College alumni
Indian social reformers
1881 births
20th-century Indian medical doctors
Medical doctors from Kerala
People from Thalassery
Malayali people
Activists from Kerala
Brahmos
20th-century Indian scholars
1945 deaths